Sara Lennman (born 8 April 1996) is a Swedish athlete. She competed in the women's shot put event at the 2021 European Athletics Indoor Championships.

References

External links
 

1996 births
Living people
Swedish female shot putters
Place of birth missing (living people)